7776 Takeishi, provisional designation , is a background asteroid from the inner regions of the asteroid belt, approximately  in diameter. It was discovered on 20 January 1993, by Japanese astronomer Takeshi Urata at the Nihondaira Observatory in Japan. The assumed S-type asteroid has a rotation period of 8.9 hours. It was named after Japanese amateur astronomer Masanori Takeishi.

Orbit and classification 

Takeishi is a non-family asteroid from the main belt's background population. It orbits the Sun in the inner asteroid belt at a distance of 1.9–2.6 AU once every 3 years and 5 months (1,240 days; semi-major axis of 2.26 AU). Its orbit has an eccentricity of 0.16 and an inclination of 9° with respect to the ecliptic.

Physical characteristics 

Takeishi is an assumed, stony S-type asteroid.

Rotation period 

Two rotational lightcurves of Takeishi have been obtained from photometric observations by French amateur astronomer Pierre Antonini and Laurent Bernasconi, as well as by American William Koff at the Antelope Hills Observatory  in Colorado. The fragmentary lightcurves gave a poorly determined rotation period of 8.65 and 8.90 hours, respectively. Both showed a minuscule brightness amplitude of 0.05 magnitude.

Diameter and albedo 

According to the survey carried out by the NEOWISE mission of NASA's Wide-field Infrared Survey Explorer, Takeishi measures between 5.99 and 6.165 kilometers in diameter and its surface has an albedo between 0.29 and 0.353, while the Collaborative Asteroid Lightcurve Link assumes a standard albedo for a stony asteroid of 0.20, and calculates a diameter of 7.46 kilometers based on an absolute magnitude of 13.0.

Naming 

This minor planet was named after Japanese amateur astronomer and discoverer of minor planets, Masanori Takeishi (born 1950). Between 1975 and 1993, he was a chief editor of the Japan Astronomical Circular. The official naming citation was published by the Minor Planet Center on 14 December 1997.

Notes

References

External links 
 Asteroid Lightcurve Database (LCDB), query form (info )
 Dictionary of Minor Planet Names, Google books
 Asteroids and comets rotation curves, CdR – Observatoire de Genève, Raoul Behrend
 Discovery Circumstances: Numbered Minor Planets (5001)-(10000) – Minor Planet Center
 
 

007776
Discoveries by Takeshi Urata
Named minor planets
19930120